The 1968 Tidewater 250 was a NASCAR Grand National Series event that was held on May 18, 1968, at Langley Field Speedway in Hampton, Virginia.

The transition to purpose-built racecars began in the early 1960s and occurred gradually over that decade.  Changes made to the sport by the late 1960s brought an end to the "strictly stock" vehicles of the 1950s.

Background
Langley Speedway is a paved short track measuring 0.395 miles in length, it is one of the flattest tracks in the region with only six degrees of banking in the corners and four degrees on the straights.

Summary
The race took one hour, twenty five minutes, and fifty-eight seconds to reach its conclusion. David Pearson was the winner of the race in front of ten thousand live audience members. Canadian driver Frog Fagan participated here; he started in 14th place and ended in 13th place. Fagan managed to run 212 out of 250 laps before the race ending with him still in the running.

This would be Tim Pistone's final career start and Pete Hamilton's first finish in the top five. Total winnings for this race were $4,740 ($ when adjusted for inflation) with the winner receiving $1,000 ($ when adjusted for inflation). Twelve drivers used a Ford vehicle to participate in the race in; making up the majority of the grid. Three drivers would use a Dodge while only one driver would use a Chevrolet.

Both Ed Negre and Paul Dean Holt would quit the race after driving for 76 and 73 laps apiece; no valid reason was ever given to NASCAR officials for their sudden absence from the race. Nevertheless, they were granted a $100 paycheck just for attempting to race ($ when adjusted for inflation).

Qualifying

Finishers

 David Pearson (No. 17)
 Bobby Isaac† (No. 71)
 Buddy Baker† (No. 3)
 James Hylton (No. 48)
 Pete Hamilton (No. 5)
 Richard Petty* (No. 43)
 Tom Pistone (No. 55)
 Elmo Langley† (No. 10)
 Clyde Lynn† (No. 20)
 Neil Castles (No. 06)
 Bobby Mausgrover (No. 88)
 Wendell Scott*† (No. 34)
 Frog Fagan† (No. 95)
 Jabe Thomas (No. 25)
 Roy Tyner*†  (No. 09)
 John Sears*† (No. 4)
 Ed Negre* (No.8)
 Paul Dean Holt* (No. 01)
 Earl Brooks*† (No. 28)
 Henley Gray* (No. 19)

* Driver failed to finish race 
† signifies that the driver is known to be deceased

Timeline
Section reference: 
 Start of race: David Pearson had the pole position to begin the event.
 Lap 4: Earl Brooks' vehicle could not steer properly anymore.
 Lap 56: Richard Petty took over the lead from David Pearson.
 Lap 61: David Pearson took over the lead from Richard Petty.
 Lap 68: Richard Petty took over the lead from David Pearson.
 Lap 73: Paul Dean Holt quit the reason for no apparent reason.
 Lap 76: Ed Negre quit the race for reasons unknown.
 Lap 112: The engine on John Sears' vehicle stopped working in a normal fashion.
 Lap 128: The fuel line stopped working properly on Roy Tyner's vehicle.
 Lap 138: Buddy Baker took over the lead from Richard Petty.
 Lap 157: Richard Petty took over the lead from Buddy Baker.
 Lap 188: David Pearson took over the lead from Richard Petty.
 Lap 229: Wendell Scott had to leave the race due to a flat tire.
 Lap 242: Richard Petty developed engine problems in his vehicle.
 Finish: David Pearson was officially declared the winner of the event.

References

Tidewater 250
Tidewater 250
NASCAR races at Langley Field Speedway